is a stop on the Odawara Line by Odakyu Electric Railway and is located in Setagaya, Tokyo, Japan.

Station layout
The elevated station features four tracks and two side platforms. Express trains typically bypass the station on the two innermost tracks while local and semi-express trains typically stop at the station on the two outermost tracks.

Before tracks were quadrupled on this section of the Odawara Line in 2004, the station featured two tracks and two side platforms. The station was also located at street level.

History
Chitose-Funabashi Station opened on April 1, 1927.

Station numbering was introduced in 2014 with Chitose-Funabashi being assigned station number OH11.

References

Odakyu Odawara Line
Stations of Odakyu Electric Railway
Railway stations in Tokyo
Railway stations in Japan opened in 1927